Ostrovany is a village and municipality in Sabinov District in the Prešov Region of north-eastern Slovakia.

History

In historical records the village was first mentioned in 1248. In 1790 and 1865, two rich finds from the burial of a Vandalic king were discovered in Ostrovany. The contents of the grave are located at the Kunsthistorisches Museum in Vienna, Austria and Budapest, Hungary respectively. The Treasure of Osztrópataka is considered to be one of the most important early-historical findings from Slovakia.

In  2010, the town received international media attention when the town council built a wall around part of Ostrovany, essentially making the enclosed part a gated community, in an attempt to keep out Roma neighbors. Because of the apparent poverty of the Roma, at least one source likened the area outside the walls to a ghetto. The mayor Cyril Revak stated that the wall was built in order to prevent gardens from theft and vandalism, and that the Roma people had access to the village from other sides.

Demographics
Two-thirds of the population are Roma, and at least some of the Roma are impoverished enough to live in "shacks".

Geography
The municipality lies at an altitude of 318 metres and covers an area of 5.853 km². It has a population of about 1620 people.

See also
 Usti nad Labem

References

External links

www.statistics.sk

Villages and municipalities in Sabinov District
Romani communities in Slovakia